Port Lions Airport  is a state-owned, public-use airport located  northeast of the central business district of Port Lions, a city located on Kodiak Island in the Kodiak Island Borough of the U.S. state of Alaska.

Federal Aviation Administration records report that the airport had 2,386 passenger boardings (enplanements) in the calendar year 2008, 2,666 enplanements in 2009, and 2,257 in 2010. It is included in the National Plan of Integrated Airport Systems for 2011–2015, which categorized it as a general aviation facility (the commercial service category requires at least 2,500 enplanements per year).

Facilities and aircraft
For the 12-months ending December 31, 2006, the airport had 5,300 aircraft operations, an average of 14 per day: 91% air taxi and 9% general aviation.

Airlines and destinations

Airlines with scheduled passenger service to non-stop destinations:

Statistics

References

External links
 Topographic map from USGS The National Map
 Airport diagram from FAA Alaska Region

Airports in Kodiak Island Borough, Alaska